Jamai Raja is a 1990 Indian Hindi-language masala film. The film stars Hema Malini, Anil Kapoor and Madhuri Dixit. The film is directed by A. Kodandarami Reddy and is a remake of the 1989 Telugu film Attaku Yamudu Ammayiki Mogudu.

Plot
Durgeshwari is a very rich and proud lady. She stays in her palatial house with her two sons Dheeraj and Neeraj, her daughter Rekha, her brother Dindayal Trivedi, and his close friend Banke Bihari Chaturvedi along with her personal secretary, Shakti . Rekha studies in a medical college in Bombay. Durgeshwari has full control over her home and company and is feared by all. Her ambitions of wedding Rekha in a rich family like hers seem to fail when Rekha falls in love with Raja. Raja is an unemployed, poor but smart and educated man. Durgeshwari, seeing him as a smart fellow, puts a condition for agreeing to the marriage which would humiliate him and thus make him back out. She asks Raja to live with them after the marriage and not another way round, where the bride goes to live at the groom's home.

Duregeshwari tries many tricks to humiliate, demean and even portray a false image of Raja in front of Rekha with help of all her aides. But it's all in vain, Raja outdoes her tricks and eventually also enters in her good books.

Cast
 Hema Malini as Durgeshwari 
 Anil Kapoor as Raja
 Madhuri Dixit as Rekha 
 Anupam Kher as Dindayal Trivedi
 Satish Kaushik as Banke Bihari Chaturvedi
 Shakti Kapoor as Shakti
 Aloknath as Vishwanath
 Annu Kapoor as Paltu / I.C. Mishra
 Shashi Puri as Dheeraj
 Anand Balraj as Neeraj
 Seema Deo as Raja's Mother
 Disco Shanti as Aruna
 Jagdeep as Aruna's Father
 Vikas Anand as Police Inspector
 Divyavani as Indu

Soundtrack
The songs of the film were composed by Laxmikant Pyarelal and lyrics were by Javed Akhtar.

References

External links
 

1990 films
Films directed by A. Kodandarami Reddy
1990s Hindi-language films
Hindi remakes of Telugu films
Films scored by Laxmikant–Pyarelal